Quit or quitter may refer to:
 Resignation or quit, the formal act of giving up one's duties

Films
 The Quitter, a 1916 American silent western film
 The Quitter (1929 film)

Music
 Quit (band), an American pop-punk group
 "Quit", a song by Cashmere Cat from his 2017 album 9
 "Quitter" (Dawes song)
 "Quitter", a 2000 Everlast diss track by Eminem, featuring D12
 "Quit", a 1990 song by Susumu Hirasawa from The Ghost in Science
 "Quit", a song by the Waitresses from Wasn't Tomorrow Wonderful?
 Quits (EP), a 2019 extended play by Flume.

Other uses
 Queers Undermining Israeli Terrorism or QUIT, a political action group

See also
 I Quit (disambiguation)
 "I quit" match, in professional wrestling
 Quitting, a Chinese film
 Quitting smoking